Radio Tarifa was a Spanish World music ensemble, combining Flamenco, Arab-Andalusian music, Arabic music, Moorish music and other musical influences of the Mediterranean, the Middle Ages and the Caribbean.  The name of the ensemble comes from an imaginary radio station in Tarifa, a small town in the Spanish province of Cadiz, Andalusia, the closest part of Spain to Morocco. Instead of simply fusing musical styles as they are currently known, Radio Tarifa went back in time to the common past of those styles, before the final conquest of Granada in 1492, when the Moors and Jews were exiled from Spain. This invented style sheds light upon the real styles of Spain, most notably flamenco, although the band rejected all musical purism, preferring to mix arrangements of traditional compositions with their own melodies and combining instruments from Ancient Egypt, classical Greek and Roman times with modern saxophones and electric bass.

History
Both Fain Dueñas (percussion, Spain) and Vincent Molino (flute, France) were students of Moroccan multi-instrumentalist and composer Tarik Banzi of the Al-Andalus Ensemble.  Together they founded an early music group playing music from the late Middle Ages and Renaissance called Ars Antiqua Musicalis, but this group was unable to attain commercial success. When they met Benjamin Escoriza from Granada  a flamenco singer raised by Gypsies  in Madrid in the late 1980s, the last piece for a new band was in place.

Their first album, Rumba Argelina, was recorded in 1993 and became a success in Europe when it was released in 1996, and again, when it was re-issued (through association with Nonesuch Records) in America in 1997. The critical and financial success of that disc made it possible to put together a full-fledged touring band which played in 17 European countries, as well as in Turkey, Morocco, Egypt, Palestine, Australia, New Zealand, Brazil, Colombia, Mexico, Canada and the United States".

After 14 years of intense musical activity, the band announced they would take an indefinite break; their farewell concert was performed in Barcelona on 11 November 2006.  - On 9 March 2012, singer Benjamin Escoriza died at the age of 58.

Discography
Rumba Argelina (1993)
Temporal (1996)
Cruzando el río (2000)
Fiebre (2003) (live at the 2002 Toronto Small World Music Festival)
Live 25 July 2004 - Ramallah, Palestine

Personnel
 Benjamin Escoriza - vocals
 Fain Sanchez Dueñas - darbuka, percussion, backing vocals
 Vincent Molino - ney, crumhorn, poitou oboe

Guests
 Jaime Muela - flute, soprano saxophone
 Pedro Esparza - soprano saxophone
 Amir-John Haddad - oud, backing vocals
 Wafir Sh. Gibril - accordion
 Ramiro Amusategui - bouzouki
 Jorge Gomez - flamenco guitar, electric guitar
 Sebastian Rubio - pandereta, bongos
 David Purdye - electric bass, backing vocals
 Peter Oteo - electric bass
 Javier Paxarino - flutes, wind instruments

External links 
Radio Tarifa Home Page

References

Flamenco musicians
World Circuit (record label) artists
Spanish music
Nonesuch Records artists